Ahmad Alhendawi (أحمد الهنداوي) (born 20 May 1984) currently serves as the Secretary-General of the World Organization of the Scout Movement, the youngest in the history of the organization. Prior to this, he was the first-ever United Nations Secretary-General's Envoy on Youth, appointed by the Secretary-General of the United Nations on January 17, 2013 as the youngest senior official in the history of the United Nations. He supported UN Secretary-General Ban Ki-moon in addressing his thematic priority of working with and for young people as part of his current Five-Year Action Agenda.

Hailing from Jordan, Alhendawi has extensive experience working on youth issues at the local, regional and international level having previously worked in various international organizations as well as starting his own initiatives.

Early life and education 
Alhendawi is one of ten children. Alhendawi holds a master's degree in Advanced European and International Relations from the European Institute of High International Studies, a Diploma as "Policy Officer in European and International Organizations" from Bilgi University, and a B.A Degree in Computer Information Systems from Al-Balqa` Applied University.

Professional career 
Alhendawi has worked as Team Leader at a World Bank-funded programme to the League of Arab States on institutional development to strengthen Arab policy and participation. He has also served as the Youth Policy Advisor in the League of Arab States in Cairo and as an officer in the Technical Secretariat of the Arab Youth and Sports Ministers Council, between 2009 and 2012. He also served as team leader for the National Youth Policy Project in Iraq, a Youth Program Associate at the Iraq office of the UN Population Fund (UNFPA). Alhendawi has served as an Emergency Program Officer at the non-governmental organization Save the Children. He has also worked supporting the Danish Youth Council's projects in the Middle East and North Africa. As part of his voluntary work, Alhendawi was among the co-founders of the All Jordan Youth Commission and the International Youth Council in New York. He also co-founded and headed the Youth for Democracy Network at the Jordanian Commission for Democratic Culture. Mr. Alhendawi has also worked with various youth groups in Pakistan to address issues around sexual and reproductive health issues, youth participation in policy making and peace building processes.

Role as Secretary-General's Envoy on Youth 
The Envoy on Youth was mandated with bringing the voices of young people to the United Nations System. The Envoy on Youth also worked with various UN agencies, governments, civil society, and academia to enhance, empower and strengthen the position of young people within and outside of the United Nations System. Alhendawi had stated that his four objectives in office are "greater participation of youth in U.N. programs, greater U.N. advocacy for youth, "harmonization" of the many youth programs scattered throughout U.N. offices, and partnership with youth across all income and social levels."

Alhendawi is a firm believer in the Sustainable Development Goals (SDGs) and believes with the right investments in young people, they can contribute significantly towards attaining the goals. He’s also contributed to the consolidation of peace efforts in places like Jordan, which led to the adoption of the Amman Youth Declaration on Youth, Peace and Security.

Scouting 
Alhendawi began his involvement in Scouting at the age of 13 when he joined the local branch of the Jordanian Association for Boy Scouts and Girl Guides. He has maintained an interest and involvement in youth support, the Scouting movement, and non-formal education throughout his career.

While serving as Youth Envoy he made the keynote speech at the 12th World Scout Youth Forum in 2014 as well as the closing speech at the 23rd World Scout Jamboree in Japan in 2015.

Alhendawi succeeded Scott Teare in March 2017 as the Secretary General of WOSM.

Publications 
Alhendawi had several papers and publications on youth and civil society, including co-authoring:
 "Working With Youth in the MENA Region, an Introductory Guide to NGO programming in Support of the Inclusion of Youth" Published by the Danish Youth Council
 The Role of Civil Society in the Arab Spring: A comparison between the role of social movements and NGOs in the Egyptian uprising.

Awards and recognitions 
 The Millennium Campus Network's Global Generation Award in 2013
 Global Youth Action Net Fellowship as a Young Global Social Entrepreneur by the International Youth Foundation in Washington DC.
 Named by The Diplomatic Courier as a Top 99 under 33 Shaper.
 Recognized by Arabian Business as one of "the 100 Most Powerful Arabs under 40" and "100 Most Influential Young Arabs in the World".
 Awarded the Silver World Award a distinguished service award of the Boy Scouts of America (BSA).

References

External links 
  at United Nations
 

1984 births
Living people
Youth activists
People from Zarqa
Al-Balqa` Applied University alumni
Jordanian activists
Istanbul Bilgi University alumni
Jordanian officials of the United Nations
Special Envoys of the Secretary-General of the United Nations